The Byblos Necropolis graffito is a Phoenician inscription situated in the Royal necropolis of Byblos.

The graffito of Ahiram's tomb was found on the south wall of the shaft leading to the hypogeum, about three meters from the opening.

The three-line graffito reads:

ld‘t 
hn ypd lk 
tḥt zn

translated by archaeologist William F. Albright as:

Attention!
Behold, thou shalt come to grieve
below here!

René Dussaud, who found the text, translated it as "Avis, voici ta perte (est) ci-dessous".

The fourth sign of the second line (now considered to be a pē), is not very clear, a bēt seems to have been engraved on top of a qōp, or vice versa.

Pierre Montet, the archaeologist who excavated the royal necropolis 1922, made the following comment:
Since the graffiti is a little higher than the niches on the east and west walls, it is easy to understand why this notice was engraved here. The beams that rested in the niches supported a floor spanning the width of the shaft. The builders of the tomb did not consider that the king's corpse was sufficiently protected by the paving of the opening and by the wall built at the entrance to the chamber halfway up the well, so they laid a floor of wood which acted as a third obstacle. The looters, who would have removed the paving and started to empty the well, could not have avoided seeing the notice once they reached this floor.

Bibliography

References

Phoenician inscriptions
Graffiti and unauthorised signage
Archaeological sites in Lebanon
Archaeological artifacts
Byblos
Phoenician funerary practices